Markia is a genus of katydids found in Central and South America.

Species
Species include:

 Markia agudeloi Cadena-Castañeda, 2013
 Markia arizae Cadena-Castañeda, 2013
 Markia bolivarensis Cadena-Castañeda, 2013
 Markia erinaceus Cadena-Castañeda & Gorochov, 2013
 Markia espinachi Cadena-Castañeda, 2013
 Markia gaianii Cadena-Castañeda, 2013
 Markia guerreroi Cadena-Castañeda, 2013
 Markia hystrix (Westwood, 1844)
 Markia major (Brunner von Wattenwyl, 1878)
 Markia nicolasi Cadena-Castañeda, 2013
 Markia sarriai Cadena-Castañeda, 2013

References

Phaneropterinae
Orthoptera of South America